Brandy Norwood, an American singer and actress, has accumulated numerous awards since her career began in the early 1990s. This lists is a condensed list of her most notable awards and nominations.

All Africa Music Awards

|-
|rowspan="2"|2022
|Brandy
|Best Global Artist
|
|-
| Tiwa Savage feat. Brandy - "Somebody's Son"
|Best African Collaboration
|
|-

American Music Awards 

|-
|rowspan="2"|1996
|rowspan="6"|Brandy
|Favorite Soul/R&B New Artist
|
|-
|Favorite Soul/R&B Female Artist
|
|-
|rowspan="1"|1997
|Favorite Soul/R&B Female Artist
|
|-
|rowspan="2"|1999
|Favorite Soul/R&B Female Artist
|
|-
|Favorite Pop/Rock Female Artist
|
|-
|rowspan="1"|2000
|  Favorite Female Soul/R&B Artist
|
|-

Billboard Year-End Awards  

|-
|rowspan="4"|1995
|rowspan="2"|Brandy Norwood
|Best New R&B Artist
|
|-
|Best R&B Female
|
|-
|rowspan="2"|"I Wanna Be Down"
|Best New Clip, Rap
|
|-
|Best New Clip, R&B/Urban
|
|-
|rowspan="3"|1998
|rowspan="3"|"The Boy Is Mine"
|Dance Maxi Sales Single of the Year
|
|-
|Hot 100 Sales Single of Year
|
|-
|R&B Sales Single of the Year
|
|-

Billboard Music Video Awards

|-
|rowspan="2"|1995
|I Wanna Be Down
|Best New Rap Artist Clip
|
|-
|Baby
|Best New R&B/Urban Artist Clip
|
|-
|rowspan="2"|1998
|rowspan="2"|The Boy Is Mine
|Best R&B/Urban Clip
|
|}

Blockbuster Entertainment Awards
The Blockbuster Entertainment Awards were a film awards ceremony, founded by Blockbuster Inc., that ran from 1995 until 2001. The awards were produced by Ken Ehrlich every year. In 1999, Norwood received a nod for her performance in I Still Know What You Did Last Summer.

|-
|1999
|Brandy Norwood
|Favorite Actress — Horror
|
|-

BMI Awards

BMI Pop Awards 

|-
|1999
|rowspan="1"|Award Winning Song
|The Boy Is Mine
|
|-

BMI R&B/Hip-Hop Awards 

|-
|2019
|Herself
|President's Award
|
|}

California Music Awards
Founded by now-defunct BAM magazine in 1977 as the Bay Area Music Awards, the "Bammies" were expanded and renamed in 1998 to honor musical excellence across California. Rather than being chosen by an academy, winners are decided by popular vote. Ballots were available in Tower Records stores and participants could also cast their votes online.

|-
|1998
|Never Say Never
|rowspan="1"|Outstanding R&B Album
|
|-

Congress of Racial Equality

|-
|2000
|Brandy Norwood
|rowspan="1"|Outstanding Achievement Award
|
|-

ECHO Awards 

|-
|1999
|Never Say Never
|rowspan="1"|Newcomer of the year, international
|
|-

Grammy Awards

The Grammy Awards are awarded annually by the National Academy of Recording Arts and Sciences. Brandy has won one award from 12 nominations, including Record of the Year, and Best New Artist.

|-
|rowspan="2"|1996
|Brandy Norwood
|Best New Artist
|
|-
|rowspan="1"|"Baby"
|Best Female R&B Vocal Performance
|
|-
|rowspan="2"|1997
|"Missing You"
|Best Pop Collaboration with Vocals
|
|-
|"Sittin' Up In My Room"
|Best Female R&B Vocal Performance
|
|-
|rowspan="4"|1999
|rowspan="3"|"The Boy Is Mine"
|Record of the Year
|
|-
|Best R&B Performance by a Duo or Group with Vocals
|
|-
|Best R&B Song
|
|-
|rowspan="1"|Never Say Never
|Best R&B Album
|
|-
|rowspan="1"|2000
|rowspan="1"|"Almost Doesn't Count"
|Best Female R&B Vocal Performance
|
|-
|rowspan="1"|2003
|rowspan="1"|Full Moon
|Best Contemporary R&B Album
|
|-
|rowspan="1"|2005
|rowspan="1"|Afrodisiac
|Best Contemporary R&B Album
|
|-
|rowspan="1"|2020
|rowspan="1"|"Love Again" (with Daniel Caesar)
|Best R&B Performance
|
|-

MOBO Awards 

|-
| 1998 || "The Boy Is Mine" || Best International Single||  

|-
|rowspan="2"| 2004
|"Talk About Our Love" (feat. Kanye West)
|Best Collaboration
|
|-
|Brandy
|Best R&B Act
|
|-

MTV Awards

MTV Movie Awards 
The MTV Movie Awards is a film awards show presented annually on MTV. The nominees are decided by producers and executives at MTV. Norwood has won one award from two nominations.

|-
|1996
|"Sittin' Up in My Room"
|Best Movie Song
|
|-
|1999
|Brandy Norwood
|Best Female Breakthrough Performance 
|
|-

MTV Video Music Awards 
The MTV Video Music Awards are awarded annually by MTV. Norwood has received ten nominations.

|-
| rowspan="2"|  || "I Wanna Be Down" || Best Rap Video || 
|-
| "Baby" || Best Choreography in a Video || 
|-
| rowspan="2"|  || "Sittin' Up in My Room" || Best Video from a Film || 
|-
| "Brokenhearted" || Best Cinematography in a Video || 
|-
| rowspan="2"|  || rowspan="2"| "The Boy Is Mine" || Video of the Year || 
|-
| Best R&B Video || 
|-
|  || "Have You Ever?" || Best R&B Video || 
|-
|  || "What About Us?" || Viewer's Choice || 
|-
|  || "Talk About Our Love" || Best R&B Video || 
|-
|  || "The Girl is Mine" (99 Souls featuring Destiny's Child and Brandy) || Best Electronic Video ||

NAACP Image Award
The NAACP Image Award is an accolade presented by the American National Association for the Advancement of Colored People to honor outstanding people of color in film, television, music, and literature.

|-
|rowspan="3"|1996
|rowspan="1"|Brandy
|Outstanding New Artist
|
|-
|rowspan="1"|Brandy
|Outstanding Female Artist
|
|-
|rowspan="1"|Brandy
|Outstanding Album
|
|-
|rowspan="1"|1997
|rowspan="1"|Brandy
|Outstanding Youth Actor/Actress (for Moesha)
|
|-
|rowspan="2"|1998
|rowspan="1"|Brandy
|Outstanding Actress in a Comedy Series (for Moesha)
|
|-
|rowspan="1"|Brandy
|Outstanding Actress in a Television Movie, Mini-Series or Dramatic Special (for Cinderella)
|
|-
|rowspan="5"|1999
|rowspan="1"|Brandy
|Outstanding Actress in a Comedy Series (for Moesha)
|
|-
|rowspan="1"|Brandy
|Outstanding Female Artist
|
|-
|rowspan="1"|Brandy & Monica
|Outstanding Duo or Group (for The Boy Is Mine)
|
|-
|rowspan="1"|Brandy & Monica
|Outstanding Music Video (for The Boy Is Mine)
|
|-
|rowspan="1"|Never Say Never
|Outstanding Album
|
|-
|rowspan="1"|2000
|rowspan="1"|Brandy
|Outstanding Actress in a Comedy Series (for Moesha)
|
|-
|rowspan="1"|2001
|rowspan="1"|Brandy
|Outstanding Actress in a Comedy Series (for Moesha)
|
|-
|rowspan="1"|2014
|rowspan="1"|Brandy
|Outstanding Supporting Actress in a Comedy Series (for The Game)
|
|-
|2021
|B7
|Outstanding Album
|
|-
|2022
|Somebody's Son (with Tiwa Savage)
|Outstanding International Song
|
|-

Nickelodeon Kids' Choice Awards
The Nickelodeon Kids' Choice Awards are an annual awards show that airs on the Nickelodeon cable channel, which airs live and is usually held and telecast live, that honors the year's biggest television, movie, and music acts, as voted by Nickelodeon viewers.

|-
|rowspan="2"|1996
|rowspan="1"|Brandy
|Favorite Singer
|
|-
|rowspan="1"|"Baby"
|Favorite song
|
|-
|1997
|rowspan="1"|Brandy
|rowspan="1"|Favorite Singer
|
|-
|1998
|rowspan="1"|Brandy
|rowspan="1"|Favorite TV Actress (for Moesha)
|
|-
|1999
|rowspan="1"|Brandy
|rowspan="1"|Favorite Singer
|
|-
|rowspan="2"|2000
|rowspan="1"|Brandy
|Favorite TV Actress (for Moesha)
|
|-
|rowspan="1"|Brandy
|rowspan="1"|Favorite Female Singer
|
|-
|2001
|rowspan="1"|Brandy
|rowspan="1"|Favorite TV Actress (for Moesha)
|
|-

People's Choice Awards 

|-
|rowspan="1"|1996
|rowspan="1"|Brandy
|Favorite New TV Actress
|
|-
|rowspan="1"|2005
|rowspan="1"|Brandy
|Favorite Look
|
|-

Pop Awards

Source Hip-Hop Music Awards

Soul Train Awards

Soul Train Music Awards 

|-
|rowspan="3"|1995
|rowspan="1"|Brandy
|R&B/Soul Album , Female 
|
|-
|rowspan="1"|"I Wanna Be Down"
|R&B/Soul Artist, Female
|
|-
|rowspan="1"|Brandy
|R&B/soul New Artist 
|
|-
|1996
|"Brokenhearted"
|Best R&B/Soul Single, Female
|
|-
|1997
|"Sittin' Up In My Room"
|Best R&B/Soul Single, Female
|
|-
|rowspan="2"|1999
|"The Boy Is Mine"
|Best R&B/Soul Single, Group, Band or Duo
|
|-
|Never Say Never
|Best R&B/Soul Album, Female
|
|-
|2005
|Afrodisiac
|Best Soul/R&B Album-Female
|
|-
|2013
|"Put It Down"
|Best Collaboration
|
|-
|2016
|rowspan="3"|Brandy
|Lady of Soul Award
|
|-
|rowspan="3"|2020
|Best Female R&B/Soul Artist
|
|-
|Soul Train Certified Award
|
|-
|B7
|Album of the Year
|
|-

Soul Train Lady of Soul Awards 

|-
|rowspan="4"|1995
|rowspan="1"|Brandy
|R&B/Soul Album of the Year
|

|-
|rowspan="1"|Brandy
|R&B/Soul New Artist
|
|-
|rowspan="2"|"I Wanna Be Down"
| Best R&B/Single, Solo
|
|-
|Best R&B/Soul Song of The Year
|
|-
|rowspan="1"|1996
|rowspan="1"|Brandy
|The Aretha Franklin Award for Entertainer of the Year
|
|-
|rowspan="2"|1999
|rowspan="1"|The Boy Is Mine
|Best R&B/Soul Single, Group, Band Or Duo
|
|-
|rowspan="1"|Never Say Never
| Best R&B/Soul Album Of The Year Solo
|
|-
|rowspan="1"|2003
|"Full Moon"
|Best R&B/Soul or Rap Song,
|

Stellar Awards 

|-
|rowspan="1"|2001
|Norwood Kids Foundation
|Most Notable Achievement Awards
|

Teen Choice Awards
The Teen Choice Awards is an annual awards show that airs on the Fox Network. The awards honor the year's biggest achievements in music, movies, sports, television, fashion and more, voted by teen viewers aged 13 to 19.

|-
|rowspan="2"|1999
|rowspan="2"|Brandy
|TV – Choice Actress (for Moesha)
|
|-
|Music - Choice Female Artist
|
|-
|2003 ||Brandy ||Choice music hip-hop/R&B artist||

Urban One Honors

|-
|2018
|Brandy Norwood
|Cathy Hughes Award of Excellence
|
|-

XSCAPE Puerto Rico LGBT Arts & Cultural Music Festival

References

Brandy Awards History as Actress

Brandy
Awards and nominations